Dope sheet, also known as a crib sheet, may refer to:

 Dope sheet (animation), a planning sheet for animators, also applied to the content of TV programmes
 Scratch sheet, a publication listing betting odds on horses participating in horse racing
 The Dope Sheet, the press release and game program for the Green Bay Packers, originally written in the 1920s by George Whitney Calhoun